The Patrick Division is a former division of the National Hockey League (NHL). It was formed in 1974 as part of the Clarence Campbell Conference. The division moved to the Prince of Wales Conference in 1981. The division existed for 19 seasons until 1993. It was named in honor of Lester Patrick, player and longtime coach of the New York Rangers, who was a developer of ice hockey. It is the forerunner of the original Atlantic Division, which later became the Metropolitan Division in 2013.

Division lineups

1974–1979
 Atlanta Flames
 New York Islanders
 New York Rangers
 Philadelphia Flyers

Changes from the 1973–74 season
 The Patrick Division is formed as a result of NHL realignment
 The New York Islanders and New York Rangers come from the East Division
 The Atlanta Flames and Philadelphia Flyers come from the West Division

1979–1980
 Atlanta Flames
 New York Islanders
 New York Rangers
 Philadelphia Flyers
 Washington Capitals

Changes from the 1978–79 season
 The Washington Capitals come from the Norris Division

1980–1981
 Calgary Flames
 New York Islanders
 New York Rangers
 Philadelphia Flyers
 Washington Capitals

Changes from the 1979–80 season
 The Atlanta Flames move to Calgary, Alberta, to become the Calgary Flames

1981–1982
 New York Islanders
 New York Rangers
 Philadelphia Flyers
 Pittsburgh Penguins
 Washington Capitals

Changes from the 1980–81 season
 The Patrick Division switches from the Clarence Campbell Conference to the Prince of Wales Conference
 The Calgary Flames move to the Smythe Division
 The Pittsburgh Penguins come from the Norris Division

1982–1993
 New Jersey Devils
 New York Islanders
 New York Rangers
 Philadelphia Flyers
 Pittsburgh Penguins
 Washington Capitals

Changes from the 1981–82 season
 The Colorado Rockies move to East Rutherford, New Jersey, to become the New Jersey Devils
 The New Jersey Devils come from the Smythe Division

After the 1992–93 season
The league was reformatted into two conferences with two divisions each:
 Eastern Conference
 Atlantic Division
 Northeast Division
 Western Conference
 Central Division
 Pacific Division

Regular season Division champions
 1975 – Philadelphia Flyers (51–18–11, 113 pts)
 1976 – Philadelphia Flyers (51–13–16, 118 pts)
 1977 – Philadelphia Flyers (48–16–16, 112 pts)
 1978 – New York Islanders (48–17–15, 111 pts)
 1979 – New York Islanders (51–15–14, 116 pts)
 1980 – Philadelphia Flyers (48–12–20, 116 pts)
 1981 – New York Islanders (48–18–14, 110 pts)
 1982 – New York Islanders (54–16–10, 118 pts)
 1983 – Philadelphia Flyers (49–23–8, 106 pts)
 1984 – New York Islanders (50–26–4, 104 pts)
 1985 – Philadelphia Flyers (53–20–7, 113 pts)
 1986 – Philadelphia Flyers (53–23–4, 110 pts)
 1987 – Philadelphia Flyers (46–26–8, 100 pts)
 1988 – New York Islanders (39–31–10, 88 pts)
 1989 – Washington Capitals (41–29–10, 92 pts)
 1990 – New York Rangers (36–31–13, 85 pts)
 1991 – Pittsburgh Penguins (41–33–6, 88 pts)
 1992 – New York Rangers (50–25–5, 105 pts)
 1993 – Pittsburgh Penguins (56–21–7, 119 pts)

Season results

Playoff Division champions
 1982 – New York Islanders
 1983 – New York Islanders
 1984 – New York Islanders
 1985 – Philadelphia Flyers
 1986 – New York Rangers
 1987 – Philadelphia Flyers
 1988 – New Jersey Devils
 1989 – Philadelphia Flyers
 1990 – Washington Capitals
 1991 – Pittsburgh Penguins
 1992 – Pittsburgh Penguins
 1993 – New York Islanders

Stanley Cup winners produced
 1975 – Philadelphia Flyers
 1980 – New York Islanders
 1981 – New York Islanders
 1982 – New York Islanders
 1983 – New York Islanders
 1991 – Pittsburgh Penguins
 1992 – Pittsburgh Penguins

Presidents' Trophy winners produced
 1992 – New York Rangers
 1993 – Pittsburgh Penguins

Patrick Division titles won by team

References
 NHL History

National Hockey League divisions